Bazki is a rural locality (a khutor) in Bobrovskoye Rural Settlement, Serafimovichsky District, Volgograd Oblast, Russia. The population was 280 as of 2010. There are 7 streets.

Geography 
Bazki is located on the Belaya Nemukha River, 22 km south of Serafimovich (the district's administrative centre) by road. Rastopinskaya is the nearest rural locality.

References 

Rural localities in Serafimovichsky District